Epiphthora melanombra is a moth of the family Gelechiidae. It was described by Edward Meyrick in 1888. It is found in New Zealand.

The wingspan is 10–11 mm. The forewings are whitish densely irrorated (sprinkled) with black, appearing grey. There is a suffused blackish spot in the disc before the middle, another on the anal angle, and a third less apparent towards the apex. The hindwings are grey.

The larvae mine blotches in the leaves of Olearia avicenniaefolia.

References

Moths described in 1888
Epiphthora
Taxa named by Edward Meyrick
Moths of New Zealand